, or just Law, is a player character from the Tekken fighting game franchise by Bandai Namco Entertainment. He makes his series debut in the original Tekken, in which he is a Chinese-American restaurateur who wants to open a martial arts school that he hopes to fund with the prize money from the Tekken series' King of Iron Fist fighting tournaments. He has a son named Forest Law who becomes playable later in the series, and is close friends with fellow contestant Paul Phoenix. Law has made limited appearances in alternate Tekken media such as the 2009 feature film, and is often described as a tribute to martial artist Bruce Lee, with whom Law shares many characteristics and for which he has received mixed critical and public reception.

Appearances

In video games
Marshall Law is a martial artist who owns a restaurant in San Francisco's Chinatown, and like his close friend Paul Phoenix, financial difficulty becomes his primary motive for entering the King of Iron Fist fighting tournaments held throughout the Tekken series. Sometimes known as "The Fighting Chef", Law is the father of Forest Law. He enters the first King of Iron Fist Tournament in the original game in hopes of opening his own dojo with the winnings, Law would eventually draw against Wang Jinrei. Despite not winning the tournament, Marshall would eventually open his own dojo. However, in Tekken 2, his students are soon attacked and his dojo destroyed by Baek Doo San, provoking Law into entering the second tournament to seek revenge. Law would eventually face his villainous assailant and successfully defeated him, Law would drop out of the tournament after achieving his goal. In Tekken 3, his storyline details that he rebuilt his dojo while running a successful restaurant chain called "Marshall China" in the United States. Meanwhile, Paul convinces Marshall's son Forest Law to enter the third tournament, which causes friction between Law and Paul.

Similar to Paul's storyline in Tekken 4, Law's restaurant business goes under and he is consequently bankrupt. He attempts to use the fourth tournament as a crutch to ease his money troubles, but is unable to do so and he is afterwards relegated to taking a dishwashing job in Japan, where the tournaments are held. While participating in the fifth tournament in Tekken 5 in hopes of being able to cover medical bills stemming from Forest being hurt in a motorcycle accident, Law is deported to the United States upon discovery that he was employed illegally in Japan. Paul approaches Law with the proposition of forming a team for the upcoming sixth tournament, believing that the odds of victory (and winning the prize money) would be better as a group than individually, and Law accepts. They later add boxer Steve Fox to their ranks, while they did well in the tournament, Paul and Law ended up being paired against each other and they both fought to a draw, as a result they were unable to claim the top prize.

Marshall also appears in the noncanonical Tekken games Tekken Tag Tournament 2,  Tekken Revolution, Street Fighter X Tekken, and the 2005 Namco beat 'em up Urban Reign. Marshall appears as a Spirit in the Nintendo crossover video game Super Smash Bros. Ultimate.

Design and gameplay
Marshall Law is widely accepted as an homage to famed martial artist and actor Bruce Lee in his design and fighting style. Though this has never been publicly confirmed by Tekken series producer Katsuhiro Harada, he expressed regret in a 2015 interview for modeling many series characters such as Law after real-life personalities: "They may have been unique, but they didn’t really have any meaning." Harada voiced both Marshall and Forest for the first five installments of the main series over a sixteen-year span, then quit after he considered himself incapable of duplicating the voices for Tekken 6 and onward. Kevin Wong of Complex noted in 2013, "Law has every single one of Bruce Lee's iconic moves—his flip kick, his one-inch punch, and his flying kick, not to mention his costumes from Enter the Dragon and Game of Death." For his character model in Tekken 4, which takes place 21 years after the events of Tekken 2, Law was given an aged look with a mustache and unkempt hair, while going shirtless with black pants and a red sash; JP Hurh of Game Revolution described the design as "hav[ing] a crack-addict look" to it, "which one might expect after years of severe physical abuse." An alternate Tekken 5 costume was designed by manga artist and character designer Ryōji Minagawa.

Like many Tekken characters, Law's fighting style is simply described as "Martial Arts". GameSpy wrote that Law in Tekken 5 had "great combo ability and low attacks", but his "combos are less damaging than other characters." According to IGN, Law has a lot of juggling options, great counterattacks and easy wall combos in Tekken 6. Tyler Nagata of GamesRadar described Law's style as "filled with hard-to-block attacks and unpredictable strikes that [are] easy to work into accidental combos."

In other media
Marshall has a brief appearance in the 1998 OVA Tekken: The Motion Picture, seen escaping the exploding Mishima resort with the other surviving fighters at the conclusion. in the 2009 live-action Tekken film, Marshall was played by Vietnamese-American martial artist and actor Cung Le, and has a fight scene with Jin Kazama. Le complained in a 2012 interview about Marshall's backflip-kick special move having been given to Jin for the fight: "If you’re not going to have Marshall Law do it, you shouldn’t have someone else do it to Marshall Law ... they [the filmmakers] kind of diluted the action a little bit which was kind of B.S."

Reception

Matt Swider of Gaming Target rated Marshall the eighth-best Tekken character out of eleven in 2006: "Marshall Law, the practitioner of 'Marshall Arts,' has always entered the Tournament with one thing on his mind: money." GamesRadar rated him among gaming's "kickass Bruce Lee clones" in 2008: "Tekken fans understand the threat that Law posed—even if he was controlled by a mere button masher." Michael Grimm of GamesRadar compared Marshall and Street Fighter character Fei Long in a 2010 feature on Street Fighter X Tekken: "There are lots of nice words to describe Fei Long and Marshall Law’s origins: tribute, homage, memorial, but we’re going to settle with 'shameless rip off'." Elton Jones of Complex ranked him the eighth-"Most Dominant Fighting Game Character" in 2012, calling him "the best" of "all the fighting game Bruce Lee copycats", while his "screams, somersault kicks and lean physique evoke memories of Hollywood's favorite 'Dragon.'" Jack Pooley of WhatCulture ranked Law the seventeenth-greatest "beat 'em up video game character" in 2014, citing his resemblance to Lee as "a large part of why he's so much damn fun to play. ... I love everything about his combat style, from his blindsiding array of kicks and flips, to the high-pitched screams he lets out as he attacks." Kurt Kalata of Hardcore Gaming 101 categorized Marshall, along with Fei Long and Mortal Kombat character Liu Kang, under "Fighting game cliché #1: the Bruce Lee ripoff." Though Marshall was included in Street Fighter X Tekken, he was only the 33rd-most requested out of 54 Tekken characters for the game in an official fan poll held by Namco in 2012, in which he received 4.57% (4,038) of 88,280 votes.

AJ Glasser of Kotaku included Marshall in his feature "The Best and Worst Fathers in Video Games" in 2009: "Law sees more of the insides of restaurants than he does of his own son, but he stops at nothing to pay the hospital bills when Forest wrecks his motorcycle." In his 2012 preview of Street Fighter X Tekken, Nate Ming of Crunchyroll described Marshall and Paul Phoenix as "get-rich-quick schemers". Sam Loveridge of Digital Spy ranked Marshall eighth in his 2016 selection of the nineteen "absolute worst" character names in video gaming, despite describing him as "badass". In a 2014 interview, Street Fighter: Assassin's Fist actor Joey Ansah singled out Law in his criticism of the evolution of the Tekken series' storytelling: "All these things started off as kind of Fist of the North Star sensibilities and they've ended up as this kind of comedy-slapstick almost pastiche of itself ... Law is now more concerned about his goddamn restaurant and it's like, what the hell happened to kind of this dark anime?"

References

Action film characters
Bruceploitation characters
Fictional American people in video games
Fictional businesspeople in video games
Fictional characters from San Francisco
Fictional characters from San Francisco Bay Area
Fictional characters from California
Fictional chefs
Fictional Chinese American people
Fictional martial artists in video games
Fictional nunchakuka
Fictional Jeet Kune Do practitioners
Male characters in video games
Tekken characters
Video game characters based on real people
Video game characters introduced in 1994